Hailey Swirbul (born 10 July 1998) is an American cross-country skier.

On 13 December 2020, she clinched her first podium in the FIS Cross-Country World Cup by finishing third in the 10 km freestyle race in Davos, Switzerland.

Her brother Keegan is a professional road cyclist.

Cross-country skiing results
All results are sourced from the International Ski Federation (FIS).

Olympic Games

World Championships

World Cup

Season standings

Individual podiums
 1 podium – (1 )

Team podiums
 1 podium – (1 )

References

External links
 

1998 births
Living people
American female cross-country skiers
Alaska Pacific University alumni
People from Eagle County, Colorado
Sportspeople from Colorado
American people of Latvian descent
21st-century American women
Cross-country skiers at the 2022 Winter Olympics
Olympic cross-country skiers of the United States